Coventry Christian Schools (CCS) is a pre-K-12 classical Christian school located in Pottstown, Pennsylvania, United States. It was founded by superintendent Mark E. Niehls. CCS first opened its doors in 1984 with only seven students in a two-morning preschool taught by two volunteer teacher

School History

1983 – Preliminary plans to open a preschool finalized. Curriculum is developed and supplies obtained. Registration with the Pennsylvania Department of Education and 501c(3) tax exemption status received from IRS.

1984 – The school is incorporated and opens its first academic year in September with seven students in a two morning preschool class taught by two volunteer teachers.

1985 – A full-day kindergarten class is added and preschool is expanded.

1986 – First grade is added.

1987 – Second grade is added. The 5.2 acre (21,000 m2) property at 962 East Schuylkill Road is purchased. 2,000 sq ft (190 m2) of usable space becomes available in the renovated schoolhouse.

1989 – The newly renovated property on Schuylkill Road opens to first through third grades. Preschool and kindergarten remain at the Coventry Hills church building.

1993 – Five temporary classroom trailers installed to provide expanded instructional space.

1994 – The first permanent addition adds 3200 sq ft (300 m2) and six new classrooms and new restrooms.

1995 – A second permanent addition adds 6400 sq ft (600 m2) of space providing a large multipurpose room and preschool with three large classrooms and a kitchen. An additional 0.8 acre (3200 m2) of adjacent property was purchased bringing the total campus area to 6 acres (24,000 m2). All students move to Coventry Campus. Eighth grade is added.

1996 – The 4 acre (16,000 m2) athletic field is professionally leveled and seeded allowing for playground expansion and home games in soccer and field hockey.

1998 – 9,500 sq ft (880 m2) of new instructional space constructed. This space included an art room, computer lab, library, science lab, and nine new classrooms. Total space is 21,000 sq ft (2,000 m2). High School expansion begins.

2000 – 2.3 acres (9,300 m2) of adjacent property is purchased for future expansion. The school receives $1 million bequest from the Penrose Keller estate. Total campus area is 9 acres (36,000 m2). Temporary modular facility installed to accommodate secondary expansion.

2001 - Coventry Christian Schools graduates its first senior class.

2002 – Full accreditation received through the National Christian School Association. The first comprehensive capital campaign is launched at CCS.

2003 – 13.2 acre (53,000 m2) Pleasantview campus purchased for new preschool site and secondary program. School building has nearly 52,000 sq ft (4800 m2) of instructional space containing 22 classrooms, library, cafeteria and kitchen.

2009 - Groundbreaking ceremony for planned event center.

2010 - Event center completed.

2011 - Elementary program moved to Pleasantview campus.

School Sports

The athletic program at CCS is a voluntary after-school program designed to supplement the physical education classes and recesses that the students participate in during the regular school hours.

CCS plays Volleyball (Girls only), Soccer (Boys in fall and girls in spring), Basketball (Both Boys and Girls), Lacrosse (Boys only) and support a Cross Country team.
The CCS eagles mascot is Talon, the eagle.

Campus

699 North Pleasantview Road, Pottstown, PA 19464

The “Pleasantview” Campus is so named because it is located on Pleasantview Road. There are 20 classrooms as well as an Art Room, Multipurpose Room/Gym, Chapel, Library, School Store, Cafeteria, high school science lab, and administrative offices.

This campus is also the meeting place of the Chesmont Church of Christ, which convenes in the chapel.

References

External links
http://www.coventrychristian.com/

Christian schools in Pennsylvania
Classical Christian schools
Private elementary schools in Pennsylvania
Private high schools in Pennsylvania
Private middle schools in Pennsylvania
Educational institutions established in 1984
Schools in Montgomery County, Pennsylvania
1984 establishments in Pennsylvania